Debyossky District (Debes joros) is an administrative and municipal district (raion), one of the twenty-five in the Udmurt Republic, Russia. It is located in the northeast of the republic. Its administrative center is the rural locality (a selo) of Debyosy. Population:  14,085 (2002 Census);  The population of Debyosy accounts for 45.2% of the district's total population.

Geography
The Cheptsa River flows through the district from east to west. Others rivers of significance include the Ita, the Pykhta, the Medlo, the Il, the Irymka, and others.

History
The district was created on July 15, 1929 by merging Debyosskaya and Polomskaya Volosts of Glazovsky Uyezd with Tylovayskaya Volost of Izhevsky Uyezd. In 1962, the district was abolished and merged into Kezsky District, but it was restored in 1965.

Demographics
Ethnically, the population of the district consists mostly of the Udmurt people (79%) and Russians (19.7)%.

References

Notes

Sources

Districts of Udmurtia